Karuna Sankar Bhattacharya (1909–1979) was a former Indian footballer who represented and captained the India national football team and Mohun Bagan, a football club in Kolkata. The Karuna Bhattacharya Award is given to the best player of Mohun Bagan in every season. On 11 July 2015 Mohun Bagan conferred the "Mohun Bagan Ratna" to Karuna Bhattacharya. He was the first captain of the India national football team during their first officially recognised match in the international tour of Australia against the Australia national football team in 1938.

Football career
Bhattacharya represented Mohun Bagan for nine consecutive seasons from 1930 onwards. He played alongside Gostha Pal, Syed Abdus Samad, Umapati Kumar, Balaidas Chatterjee, Sanmatha Dutta, Bimal Mukherjee, R. Lumsden, Satu Chowdhury, and many others during that time. The period from 1933 to 1939 was a golden era for Mohun Bagan, and they won 29 trophies during this time. In these 7 years, Mohun Bagan was virtually invincible in derby losing only 1 match that period to an East Bengal. From 1938 onwards, he did play few years in Customs.

After brushing up his skills under the coaching of Dukhiram Majumder, Bhattacharya started his career in Aryan before joining Mohun Bagan in 1930. He was scouted by Dukhiram Majumder in Berhampur, and was signed by Aryan in 1928. Bhattacharya debuted for the club in Rovers Cup.

He joined Mohun Bagan in 1930. With the club, he scored several important goals in his football career while playing as the right-in in the 2–3–5 formation. He was one of the most vital players in the team when Mohun Bagan won their first ever league title, winning the Calcutta Football League in 1939. He also played few exhibition matches in Bangladesh with IFA XI in 1930.

In July 1938, Bhattacharya went on to play an international charity match against an 'all European team' in Calcutta, where they were defeated by a solitary goal. He was the captain of the Indian team, managed by Pankaj Gupta, that went to Australia in 1938 after the invitation from Australian Football Association. He was one of the stars during the Australia tour, scoring a brace against Queensland and the Australia National Team. He was also part of the Indian team that played against the Olympic team of China in 1936. The match ended in a 1–1 draw.

Bhattacharya also was part of several Indians vs. Europeans football matches from 1931 to 1939. During this period, he played against the Europeans in 1932 (5–0), 1933 (2–0), 1935 (5–0), 1937 (1–0), 1938 (0–1), and 1939 (2–2). In this series which was held once a year, Karuna Bhattacharya scored in 1932 (2 goals), 1935 (2 goals), 1939 (1 goal). He also was part of the IFA XI side that went to Ceylon and South Africa tour in 1933 and 1934 respectively. IFA XI won 4 matches in Ceylon (3–2, 4–1, 1–0, 2–0) while the other match ended in a 1–1 draw. Out of the 19 games played in South Africa, IFA XI won 18 (6–0, 6–1, 6–1, 2–0, 2–0, 7–1, 9–0, 6–1, 3–1, 4–1, 6–1, 8–1, 1–0, 2–1, 4–1, 2–0, 2–0, 5–0) and lost just 1 match (1–3). Under the captaincy of Bhattacharya, the Indian team played 15 games, out of which they won 6 (6–1, 5–2, 5–2, 4–1, 6–4, 3–1), drew 2 (4–4, 3–3) and lost 7 matches (2–4, 4–6, 1–2, 3–5, 4–5, 4–6, 1–5).

Post-playing career
After retiring from football, he became the football secretary of Mohun Bagan in 1955 and 1961, and also worked as the tennis secretary in 1954. He later became manager of the "green and maroon brigade" in several tournaments including their tour of Indonesia in 1956, tour of East Africa in 1961, and tour of Sri Lanka in 1968. As manager of Mohun Bagan, Bhattacharya along with club officials Sailen Manna and Chuni Goswami went with team to newly independent Bangladesh in May 1972, where they defeated Dhaka Mohammedan in first match but lost the second match to Shadhin Bangla football team.

International statistics
Scores and results list India's goal tally first.

Honours
Mohun Bagan
Coochbehar Cup: 1931, 1935, 1936
Lakhsmibilas Cup: 1937
Trades Cup: 1938

Individual
Mohun Bagan Ratna: 2015

Legacy
Mohun Bagan Athletic Club began giving the "Karuna Sankar Bhattacharya Memorial Award for best footballer" in memory of him.

See also

Football in Kolkata
History of Indian football
History of the India national football team
List of India national football team captains

References

Bibliography

 
 

 
 

1909 births
1979 deaths
Indian footballers
India international footballers
Mohun Bagan AC players
Aryan FC players
Association football wingers
Footballers from West Bengal
Calcutta Football League players